Saint-Vallier may refer to:

Places

France
 Saint-Vallier, Charente, in the Charente département
 Saint-Vallier, Drôme, in the Drôme département
 Saint-Vallier, Saône-et-Loire, in the Saône-et-Loire département
 Saint-Vallier, Vosges, in the Vosges département
 Saint-Vallier-de-Thiey, in the Alpes-Maritimes département
 Saint-Vallier-sur-Marne, in the Haute-Marne département

Quebec
Saint-Vallier, Quebec, a municipality in Bellechasse Regional County Municipality

People
 Valère de Langres (died 411), Christian saint also known as Vallier de Langres
 Jean-Baptiste de La Croix de Chevrières de Saint-Vallier (1653–1727), second bishop of Quebec